The 1971–72 Pittsburgh Penguins season was the franchise's fifth season in the National Hockey League. The team finished 26–38–14 and were tied with their cross-state rival Philadelphia Flyers, who had an identical record, for the fourth and final playoff berth in the West Division. The Penguins made the playoffs for the second time in team history, having won the season series 3–2–1 against the Flyers. However, the Penguins were swept by the Chicago Black Hawks in four games in the first round.

Offseason

Regular season

Final standings

Schedule and results

|- style="background:#cfc;"
| 1 || October 9 || Philadelphia || 2–3 || Pittsburgh ||  || 11,733 || 1–0–0 || 2
|- style="background:#fcf;"
| 2 || October 10 || Pittsburgh || 1–2 || Buffalo ||  || 15,429 || 1–1–0 || 2
|- style="background:#cfc;"
| 3 || October 13 || Pittsburgh || 4–1 || Los Angeles ||  || 7,828 || 2–1–0 || 4
|- style="background:#cfc;"
| 4 || October 16 || Pittsburgh || 2–1 || Vancouver ||  || 15,570 || 3–1–0 || 6
|- style="background:#cfc;"
| 5 || October 17 || Pittsburgh || 4–2 || California ||  || 2,123 || 4–1–0 || 8
|- style="background:#cfc;"
| 6 || October 20 || Los Angeles || 1–8 || Pittsburgh ||  || 7,592 || 5–1–0 || 10
|- style="background:#fcf;"
| 7 || October 23 || Chicago || 5–2 || Pittsburgh ||  || 13,100 || 5–2–0 || 10
|- style="background:#ffc;"
| 8 || October 24 || Pittsburgh || 1–1 || NY Rangers ||  || 17,250 || 5–2–1 || 11
|- style="background:#fcf;"
| 9 || October 27 || California || 6–4 || Pittsburgh ||  || 9,238 || 5–3–1 || 11
|- style="background:#fcf;"
| 10 || October 28 || Pittsburgh || 0–2 || Minnesota ||  || 15,101 || 5–4–1 || 11
|- style="background:#ffc;"
| 11 || October 30 || NY Rangers || 1–1 || Pittsburgh ||  || 8,973 || 5–4–2 || 12
|- style="background:#fcf;"
| 12 || October 31 || Pittsburgh || 1–3 || Detroit ||  || 10,870 || 5–5–2 || 12
|-

|- style="background:#fcf;"
| 13 || November 3 || Pittsburgh || 3–5 || California ||  || 3,293 || 5–6–2 || 12
|- style="background:#fcf;"
| 14 || November 5 || Pittsburgh || 2–4 || Vancouver ||  || 15,570 || 5–7–2 || 12
|- style="background:#fcf;"
| 15 || November 7 || Pittsburgh || 1–4 || Chicago ||  ||  || 5–8–2 || 12
|- style="background:#cfc;"
| 16 || November 9 || Pittsburgh || 4–1 || St. Louis ||  || 17,888 || 6–8–2 || 14
|- style="background:#cfc;"
| 17 || November 10 || Vancouver || 1–3 || Pittsburgh ||  || 7,324 || 7–8–2 || 16
|- style="background:#cfc;"
| 18 || November 13 || Los Angeles || 4–6 || Pittsburgh ||  || 9,756 || 8–8–2 || 18
|- style="background:#fcf;"
| 19 || November 16 || Minnesota || 5–1 || Pittsburgh ||  || 7,800 || 8–9–2 || 18
|- style="background:#fcf;"
| 20 || November 18 || Pittsburgh || 3–4 || Minnesota ||  || 15,235 || 8–10–2 || 18
|- style="background:#fcf;"
| 21 || November 20 || St. Louis || 4–2 || Pittsburgh ||  || 12,276 || 8–11–2 || 18
|- style="background:#fcf;"
| 22 || November 21 || Pittsburgh || 3–7 || Chicago ||  ||  || 8–12–2 || 18
|- style="background:#fcf;"
| 23 || November 24 || Toronto || 2–1 || Pittsburgh ||  || 6,020 || 8–13–2 || 18
|- style="background:#fcf;"
| 24 || November 27 || Pittsburgh || 1–3 || Montreal ||  || 17,500 || 8–14–2 || 18
|-

|- style="background:#cfc;"
| 25 || December 1 || Detroit || 2–4 || Pittsburgh ||  || 7,083 || 9–14–2 || 20
|- style="background:#cfc;"
| 26 || December 4 || NY Rangers || 2–4 || Pittsburgh ||  || 9,662 || 10–14–2 || 22
|- style="background:#fcf;"
| 27 || December 5 || Pittsburgh || 3–5 || Boston ||  || 14,995 || 10–15–2 || 22
|- style="background:#ffc;"
| 28 || December 8 || California || 1–1 || Pittsburgh ||  || 8,831 || 10–15–3 || 23
|- style="background:#ffc;"
| 29 || December 11 || Buffalo || 3–3 || Pittsburgh ||  || 7,603 || 10–15–4 || 24
|- style="background:#fcf;"
| 30 || December 12 || Pittsburgh || 1–6 || NY Rangers ||  || 17,250 || 10–16–4 || 24
|- style="background:#fcf;"
| 31 || December 15 || Pittsburgh || 2–3 || Toronto ||  || 16,324 || 10–17–4 || 24
|- style="background:#fcf;"
| 32 || December 18 || Boston || 4–3 || Pittsburgh ||  || 11,837 || 10–18–4 || 24
|- style="background:#ffc;"
| 33 || December 19 || Pittsburgh || 2–2 || Boston ||  || 14,995 || 10–18–5 || 25
|- style="background:#fcf;"
| 34 || December 22 || Pittsburgh || 2–4 || NY Rangers ||  || 17,250 || 10–19–5 || 25
|- style="background:#cfc;"
| 35 || December 25 || Montreal || 2–4 || Pittsburgh ||  || 7,778 || 11–19–5 || 27
|- style="background:#fcf;"
| 36 || December 26 || Pittsburgh || 1–6 || Philadelphia ||  || 14,626 || 11–20–5 || 27
|- style="background:#fcf;"
| 37 || December 28 || Toronto || 4–2 || Pittsburgh ||  || 11,158 || 11–21–5 || 27
|- style="background:#ffc;"
| 38 || December 31 || Buffalo || 3–3 || Pittsburgh ||  || 7,908 || 11–21–6 || 28
|-

|- style="background:#ffc;"
| 39 || January 5 || Pittsburgh || 3–3 || Chicago ||  ||  || 11–21–7 || 29
|- style="background:#fcf;"
| 40 || January 8 || Chicago || 4–0 || Pittsburgh ||  || 13,100 || 11–22–7 || 29
|- style="background:#fcf;"
| 41 || January 9 || Pittsburgh || 2–4 || Detroit ||  || 12,570 || 11–23–7 || 29
|- style="background:#ffc;"
| 42 || January 12 || Boston || 2–2 || Pittsburgh ||  || 8,449 || 11–23–8 || 30
|- style="background:#fcf;"
| 43 || January 13 || Pittsburgh || 1–7 || Montreal ||  || 16,252 || 11–24–8 || 30
|- style="background:#cfc;"
| 44 || January 15 || Philadelphia || 2–4 || Pittsburgh ||  || 9,225 || 12–24–8 || 32
|- style="background:#fcf;"
| 45 || January 19 || Vancouver || 6–1 || Pittsburgh ||  || 7,189 || 12–25–8 || 32
|- style="background:#fcf;"
| 46 || January 22 || Pittsburgh || 0–1 || St. Louis ||  || 18,829 || 12–26–8 || 32
|- style="background:#ffc;"
| 47 || January 23 || Montreal || 3–3 || Pittsburgh ||  || 8,414 || 12–26–9 || 33
|- style="background:#fcf;"
| 48 || January 26 || St. Louis || 2–1 || Pittsburgh ||  || 9,316 || 12–27–9 || 33
|- style="background:#fcf;"
| 49 || January 29 || Chicago || 4–2 || Pittsburgh ||  || 13,006 || 12–28–9 || 33
|- style="background:#fcf;"
| 50 || January 30 || Pittsburgh || 0–4 || Philadelphia ||  || 14,626 || 12–29–9 || 33
|-

|- style="background:#cfc;"
| 51 || February 3 || Pittsburgh || 4–3 || St. Louis ||  || 17,871 || 13–29–9 || 35
|- style="background:#fcf;"
| 52 || February 5 || Pittsburgh || 1–8 || Los Angeles ||  || 10,102 || 13–30–9 || 35
|- style="background:#cfc;"
| 53 || February 9 || Pittsburgh || 4–1 || Toronto ||  || 16,370 || 14–30–9 || 37
|- style="background:#cfc;"
| 54 || February 10 || Los Angeles || 1–6 || Pittsburgh ||  || 6,620 || 15–30–9 || 39
|- style="background:#fcf;"
| 55 || February 12 || NY Rangers || 8–3 || Pittsburgh ||  || 12,031 || 15–31–9 || 39
|- style="background:#cfc;"
| 56 || February 13 || Vancouver || 4–6 || Pittsburgh ||  || 6,806 || 16–31–9 || 41
|- style="background:#cfc;"
| 57 || February 16 || Toronto || 2–4 || Pittsburgh ||  || 7,814 || 17–31–9 || 43
|- style="background:#cfc;"
| 58 || February 17 || Pittsburgh || 2–0 || Buffalo ||  || 15,360 || 18–31–9 || 45
|- style="background:#fcf;"
| 59 || February 19 || Detroit || 6–2 || Pittsburgh ||  || 8,105 || 18–32–9 || 45
|- style="background:#fcf;"
| 60 || February 20 || Pittsburgh || 0–2 || Minnesota ||  || 15,316 || 18–33–9 || 45
|- style="background:#fcf;"
| 61 || February 23 || Pittsburgh || 0–2 || Toronto ||  || 16,362 || 18–34–9 || 45
|- style="background:#cfc;"
| 62 || February 26 || Philadelphia || 2–5 || Pittsburgh ||  || 11,208 || 19–34–9 || 47
|- style="background:#fcf;"
| 63 || February 27 || Pittsburgh || 3–5 || Montreal ||  || 18,003 || 19–35–9 || 47
|-

|- style="background:#cfc;"
| 64 || March 2 || Detroit || 4–7 || Pittsburgh ||  || 7,670 || 20–35–9 || 49
|- style="background:#cfc;"
| 65 || March 4 || Minnesota || 2–4 || Pittsburgh ||  || 10,532 || 21–35–9 || 51
|- style="background:#fcf;"
| 66 || March 5 || Pittsburgh || 3–6 || Detroit ||  || 14,768 || 21–36–9 || 51
|- style="background:#fcf;"
| 67 || March 8 || Montreal || 5–4 || Pittsburgh ||  || 9,598 || 21–37–9 || 51
|- style="background:#cfc;"
| 68 || March 11 || Boston || 4–6 || Pittsburgh ||  || 13,050 || 22–37–9 || 53
|- style="background:#ffc;"
| 69 || March 12 || Pittsburgh || 4–4 || Boston ||  || 14,995 || 22–37–10 || 54
|- style="background:#cfc;"
| 70 || March 14 || Pittsburgh || 7–4 || Vancouver ||  || 15,570 || 23–37–10 || 56
|- style="background:#ffc;"
| 71 || March 18 || Pittsburgh || 4–4 || Los Angeles ||  || 7,174 || 23–37–11 || 57
|- style="background:#ffc;"
| 72 || March 19 || Pittsburgh || 3–3 || California ||  || 5,303 || 23–37–12 || 58
|- style="background:#fcf;"
| 73 || March 22 || Buffalo || 4–3 || Pittsburgh ||  || 11,216 || 23–38–12 || 58
|- style="background:#cfc;"
| 74 || March 25 || Minnesota || 2–3 || Pittsburgh ||  || 12,561 || 24–38–12 || 60
|- style="background:#ffc;"
| 75 || March 26 || Pittsburgh || 2–2 || Buffalo ||  || 15,360 || 24–38–13 || 61
|- style="background:#cfc;"
| 76 || March 29 || California || 4–5 || Pittsburgh ||  || 10,209 || 25–38–13 || 63
|-

|- style="background:#ffc;"
| 77 || April 1 || Pittsburgh || 4–4 || Philadelphia ||  || 14,626 || 25–38–14 || 64
|- style="background:#cfc;"
| 78 || April 2 || St. Louis || 2–6 || Pittsburgh ||  || 13,100 || 26–38–14 || 66
|-

|- style="text-align:center;"
| Legend:       = Win       = Loss       = Tie

Playoffs

| # || Date || Visitor || Score || Home || Series
|- style="background:#fcf;"
| 1 || April 5 || Pittsburgh || 1–3 || Chicago || 0–1
|- style="background:#fcf;"
| 2 || April 6 || Pittsburgh || 2–3 || Chicago || 0–2
|- style="background:#fcf;"
| 3 || April 8 || Chicago || 2–0 || Pittsburgh || 0–3
|- style="background:#fcf;"
| 4 || April 9 || Chicago || 6–5 || Pittsburgh || 0–4 
|-

|- style="text-align:center;"
| ''Legend:       = Win       = Loss

Player statistics
Skaters

Goaltenders

†Denotes player spent time with another team before joining the Penguins.  Stats reflect time with the Penguins only.
‡Denotes player was traded mid-season.  Stats reflect time with the Penguins only.

Awards and records
 Val Fonteyne became the first player to play 300 games for the Penguins. He did so in a 1–5 loss to Minnesota on November 16.
 Ken Schinkel became the first player to score 200 points for the Penguins. He did so by recording an assist in a 2–4 loss to Chicago on January 29.
 Bryan Watson became the first player to earn 500 penalty minutes for the Penguins. He did so by receiving 4 PIMs in a 4–2 win over Toronto on February 16.
 Bryan Watson became the first player to earn 200 penalty minutes in one season for the Penguins. He did so by receiving 2 PIMs in a 7–4 win over Vancouver on March 14.
 Jean Pronovost became the first player to score 30 goals in a season for the Penguins. He did so in a 5–4 win over California on March 29.
 Syl Apps Jr. established a new franchise record for highest plus-minus in a season (+18). He broke the previous high of +10 set by Wally Boyer in 1971.
 Val Fonteyne established a career franchise record for games (349). He had led the category since 1969.
 Bob Woytowich set the Penguins career defenseman scoring mark at 93 points. He held the record since 1970.

Transactions
The Penguins have been involved in the following transactions during the 1971–72 season:

Trades

Player signings

Other

Draft picks

Pittsburgh Penguins' picks at the 1971 NHL Entry Draft. 

Draft notes 
 The Pittsburgh Penguins' first-round pick went to the St. Louis Blues as the result of a June 6, 1969, trade that sent Ron Schock, Craig Cameron and a 1972 second round pick to the Penguins in exchange for Lou Angotti and this pick.
 The Pittsburgh Penguins' eighth-round pick went to the Vancouver Canucks as the result of a June 10, 1970, trade that had Vancouver promise to not take certain players in expansion draft for this pick.

References

Pittsburgh Penguins seasons
Pittsburgh
Pittsburgh
Pitts
Pitts